Borgund is a former municipality in Møre og Romsdal county, Norway.  The municipality existed from 1837 until 1968 when it was merged into Ålesund Municipality.  Borgund originally encompassed the large area north of the Storfjorden and south of the Grytafjorden, from the mainland areas of today's Skodje Municipality in the east to the islands of today's Giske Municipality and the ocean in the west.  The city of Ålesund was located in the central part of Borgund, however, was not part of Borgund, and it was governed separately.  At its dissolution in 1968, the  municipality included the islands of Sula, Humla, Tørla, and Ellingsøya, as well as parts of Oksenøya, Hessa, and Nørvøya, plus many minor islands throughout the area.  The main church for the municipality was Borgund Church, located at Borgund (on the western tip of Oksenøya). The administrative centre of the municipality was at Borgund, near the church, along the Nørvasundet strait.

History
The municipality of Borgund was established on 1 January 1838 (see formannskapsdistrikt).  According to the 1835 census, the municipality had a population of 3,754. In 1849, the eastern district of Borgund including the mainland part of Borgund and the eastern part of Oksenøya island was separated from Borgund to become Skodje Municipality.  This left Borgund with 4,461 inhabitants.  On 1 January 1908, the islands of Giske, Godøya, and Valderøya in western Borgund were separated from the municipality to become the new Giske Municipality.  Borgund then had a population of 6,734.  On 1 January 1916, a small part of Skodje Municipality (population: 14) was transferred to Borgund Municipality.  Also on 1 July 1958, a small part of Hareid Municipality on the island of Sula, with 68 inhabitants, was transferred to Borgund Municipality.

During the 1960s, there were many municipal mergers across Norway due to the work of the Schei Committee. On 1 January 1965, the northern part of Borgund Municipality (including the Gamlem, Søvik, and Grytastranda areas on the mainland and the islands of Bjørnøya, Terøya and many small islands around them) with 1,191 inhabitants, was administratively transferred into the neighboring Haram Municipality to the north.  On 1 January 1968, Borgund municipality ceased to exist when it was merged with the town of Ålesund, creating the new Ålesund Municipality. Prior to the merger, Borgund had a population of 20,132.  It was the most populous municipality in Møre og Romsdal at the time.  On 1 January 1977, the island of Sula, previously a part of Borgund, was separated from Ålesund to constitute the new Sula Municipality.

Incorporation into Ålesund
There was considerable debate on the 1968 incorporation into Ålesund and on what to name the new, larger municipality. The municipal council of Borgund opposed its own incorporation into Ålesund as worked out by the Schei Committee.  However, when the Norwegian Parliament agreed to the incorporation, Borgund's municipal council passed a resolution that the new municipality be named Borgund instead of Ålesund.  The case went to the Government of Norway, who drafted a resolution that the name Ålesund should be kept. In the Council of State of 10 March 1967, the cabinet Borten agreed to this, except for Per Borten, Kjell Bondevik, Bjarne Lyngstad, and Dagfinn Vårvik who formally dissented—to no avail. The name Ålesund was recommended, and the Norwegian Parliament passed it.

Government
All municipalities in Norway, including Borgund, are responsible for primary education (through 10th grade), outpatient health services, senior citizen services, unemployment and other social services, zoning, economic development, and municipal roads.  The municipality is governed by a municipal council of elected representatives, which in turn elects a mayor.

Municipal council
The municipal council  of Borgund was made up of 41 representatives that were elected to four year terms.  The party breakdown of the final municipal council was as follows:

See also
List of former municipalities of Norway

References

Ålesund
Former municipalities of Norway
1838 establishments in Norway
1968 disestablishments in Norway